The Grand Island National Recreation Area is a national recreation area in Hiawatha National Forest under jurisdiction of the U.S. Forest Service. Grand Island was designated a national recreation area by the U.S. Congress in 1990 after the U.S. Forest Service purchased the island from its former owner, Cleveland Cliffs Iron Co.

Lake Superior
Lake Superior dominates the Grand Island biotic environment. Even in high summer, the lake's temperature rarely rises above .

Geology
Grand Island's geology is an extension of the sandstone strata of the adjacent Pictured Rocks National Lakeshore. A  perimeter trail skirts much of the island's shoreline.

History
Native Americans quickly found the fisheries around Grand Island to be a resource for seasonal and year-round living. Artifacts from as early as 3300 years before the present (1300 BC) have been found.

Tourism
Grand Island National Recreation Area is served during summer months by a tourist ferry and island tour bus. Ticket fees and an admission fee to the island are charged. During the summer months, the ferry makes several trips to the island each day.

A small portion of Grand Island, the Thumb, remained privately owned as of 2012. The Thumb contains the historic 1868 Grand Island East Channel Light or 'East Channel Light', on the eastern ship channel from Lake Superior into the port of Munising. The lighthouse remained in operation until 1913. The privately owned lighthouse can be viewed from Sand Point on the mainland, within the Pictured Rocks National Lakeshore, or may be viewed from the water.

Recreational opportunities
The U.S. Forest Services recommends that visitors enjoy camping, fishing, hiking, hunting, mountain biking, and trapping on Grand Island, subject to state license laws. There are 17 campsites within the Grand Island NRA. The largest animal with a breeding presence on the island is the black bear, from which campers must protect themselves. Rockclimbing is strongly discouraged because the island's dramatic sandstone cliffs are friable and crumbly.

The Grand Island Trail Marathon has been held on the island every July since 2005, with the exception of 2020 due to the COVID-19 pandemic. The event has featured in the past a 2K race for children and a 10K race.  In recent years, the event has included half marathon, marathon, and 50 km races.

References

External links
 Hiawatha National Forest - Grand Island Recreation Area
 Hiawatha National Forest Facebook
 Hiking Michigan excerpt

National Recreation Areas of the United States
Protected areas of Alger County, Michigan
Hiawatha National Forest
Protected areas established in 1990
1990 establishments in Michigan